Mussallem is a surname. Notable people with the surname include:

George Mussallem (1903–2007), Canadian car dealer and politician
Helen Mussallem (1915–2012), Canadian nurse